From Sea to Sea and Other Sketches, Letters of Travel is a book containing Rudyard Kipling's articles about his 1889 travels from India to Burma, China, Japan, and the United States en route to England.

This collection is usually called Letters of Travel 1892-1913 in the 21st century.

Notes

Travel books
Books by Rudyard Kipling